Barbus strumicae is a disputed species of European cyprinid freshwater fish. It is found in Greece, Macedonia, and Bulgaria, in drainages of the Aegean Sea basin.

But it is often included in B. cyclolepis.

References 

 

S
Freshwater fish of Europe
Fish described in 1955
Taxa named by Stanko Karaman